In geometry, a corner-point grid is a tessellation of a Euclidean 3D volume, where the base cell has 6 faces (hexahedron).

A set of straight lines defined by their end points define the pillars of the corner-point grid. The pillars have a lexicographical ordering that determines neighbouring pillars. On each pillar, a constant number of nodes (corner-points) is defined. A corner-point cell is now the volume between 4 neighbouring pillars and two neighbouring points on each pillar. 

The cells are ordered naturally, where the index  runs the fastest and  the slowest.

Data within the interior of such cells can be computed by trilinear interpolation from the boundary values at the 8 corners, 12 edges, and 6 faces.

In the special case of all pillars being vertical, the top and bottom face of each corner-point cell are described by bilinear surfaces and the side faces are planes.

Corner-point grids are supported by most reservoir simulation software, and has become an industry standard.

Degeneracy

A main feature of the format is the ability to define erosion surfaces in geological modelling, effectively done by collapsing nodes along each pillar. This means that the corner-point cells degenerate and may have less than 6 faces.

For the corner-point grids, non-neighboring connections are supported, meaning that grid cells that are not neighboring in ijk-space can be defined as neighboring. This feature allows for representation of faults with significant throw/displacement. Moreover, the neighboring grid cells do not need to have matching cell faces (just overlap).

References

 Corner Point Grid. Open Porous Media Initiative
 Aarnes J, Krogstad S and Lie KA (2006). Multiscale Mixed/Mimetic Methods on Corner Point Grids. SINTEF ICT, Dept. Applied Mathematics
 

Tessellation
Geometry